Arrese is a Spanish surname. Notable people with the surname include:

 Emeterio Arrese (1869–1954), poet
 Felipe Arrese Beitia (1841–1906), Spanish poet and writer
 Jordi Arrese (born 1964), Spanish tennis player
 José Luis de Arrese (1905–1986), Spanish politician

Spanish-language surnames